Volodymyr Raion is a raion in Volyn Oblast in western Ukraine. Its administrative center is the city of Volodymyr. Population: 

On 18 July 2020, as part of the administrative reform of Ukraine, the number of raions of Volyn Oblast was reduced to four, and the area of Volodymyr-Volynskyi Raion was significantly expanded.  The January 2020 estimate of the raion population was  On 18 July 2022 raion was renamed to Volodymyrskyi Raion.

See also
 Administrative divisions of Volyn Oblast

References

External links
 vvadm.gov.ua 

Raions of Volyn Oblast
Volodymyr-Volynskyi Raion
1940 establishments in Ukraine